Frank Schmalleger (born August 28, 1947) is a Distinguished Professor Emeritus at the University of North Carolina at Pembroke. He holds degrees from the University of Notre Dame and The Ohio State University, having earned both a master's (1970) and a doctorate in sociology (1974) from The Ohio State University with a special emphasis in criminology. From 1976 to 1994, he taught criminology and criminal justice courses at the University of North Carolina at Pembroke. For the last 16 of those years, he chaired the university's Department of Sociology, Social Work, and Criminal Justice. The university named him Distinguished Professor in 1991.

Schmalleger is the author of numerous articles and more than 40 books, including the widely used Criminal Justice Today (Pearson, 2019), Criminology Today (Pearson, 2021), Criminal Law Today (Pearson, 2022); and Corrections in the 21st Century (with John Smykla; McGraw-Hill, 2020).

Schmalleger has taught in the online graduate program of the New School for Social Research, helping build the world's first electronic classrooms in support of distance learning on the Internet. As an adjunct professor with Webster University in St. Louis, Missouri, Schmalleger helped develop the university's graduate program in security administration and loss prevention. He taught courses in that curriculum for more than a decade. An avid Web user and website builder, Schmalleger is also the creator of a number of websites, including the Criminal Justice Cybrary (no longer operating), and the Criminal Justice Distance Learning Consortium. The Cybrary was purchased by Pearson Publishing in 2006.

Education

 Ph.D., 1974, The Ohio State University, specializing in crime and deviance.
 M.A.,  1972, The Ohio State University, specializing in crime and deviance.
 B.B.A., 1969, The University of Notre Dame, marketing major

Quotes

"In order to communicate knowledge we must first catch, then hold, a person’s interest—be it student, colleague, or policymaker. Our writing, our speaking,  our teaching, and our research must be relevant to the problems facing people today, and they must—in some way—help solve those problems."
"It is my hope that the technological and publishing revolutions will combine with growing social awareness to facilitate needed changes in our system; and will supplant self-serving system-perpetuated injustices with new standards of equity, compassion, understanding, fairness, and justice for all."

Employment history

 1976 - 1994—taught criminal justice at Pembroke State University (since 1996, the University of North Carolina at Pembroke)
1978 - 1994—served as the chair of the Department of Sociology, Social Work, and Criminal Justice
1974 -1975—taught sociology and criminology courses at Ohio Dominican University in Columbus, Ohio
1982-1994—taught in the Webster University graduate programs in Security Management and the Administration at Justice Pope Air Force Base/Ft. Bragg.

See also
 Attempt
 Burglary
 Criminology
 Inchoate crime
 Victimology

Writings by Frank Schmalleger

Criminal Justice: A Brief Introduction(2020)
Criminology Today: An Integrative Introduction (2020)
Criminology(Justice Series, 2020)
Criminal Justice Today: An Introductory Text for the 21st Century(2019)
Criminal Law Today (2017)
Private Security Today, with Carter Smith and Larry Siegel (2017)
Crimes of the Internet, with Michael Pittaro (2009)
Policing Today, with John Worrall (2018)
Juvenile Delinquency, with Clemmens Bartollas (2018)
Courts and Criminal Justice in America, with John Worrall and Larry Siegel (2018)
Corrections in the Twenty-First Centurywith John Smykla (2017)
Social Deviance, with Jack Humphry (2021)
Juvenile Justice, with Catherine Marcum (2020)
A Guide to Study Skills and Careers in Criminal Justice and Public Security, with Catherine Marcum (2020)
Canadian Criminology Today (with Volk, 2001)
Canadian Criminal Justice Today (with MacAlister, McKenna, and Winterdyk, 2001);
Crime and the Justice System in America: An Encyclopedia (1997)
Trial of the Century: People of the State of California vs. Orenthal James Simpson (1996)
Career Paths: A Guide to Jobs in Federal Law Enforcement (1994)
Criminal Justice Ethics (1991)
Finding Criminal Justice in the Library (1991)
Ethics in Criminal Justice (1990)
A History of Corrections (1983)
The Social Basis of Criminal Justice (1981)

External links
CJCENTRAL (official)
SCHMALLEGER.COM

Ohio State University alumni
Living people
American criminologists
1947 births